Mantu Sen (21 June 1923 – 12 April 1990) was an Indian cricketer. He played eighteen first-class matches for Bengal between 1942 and 1959.

See also
 List of Bengal cricketers

References

External links
 

1923 births
1990 deaths
Indian cricketers
Bengal cricketers
Cricketers from Kolkata